The bust of Plácido Domingo is installed outside the Teatro Principal in Puebla's historic centre, in the Mexican state of Puebla. The sculpture was unveiled in 2017.

References

External links

 

2017 establishments in Mexico
2017 sculptures
Busts in Mexico
Monuments and memorials in Puebla
Outdoor sculptures in Puebla (city)
Sculptures of men in Mexico
Historic centre of Puebla